Gerda Helena Wrede-Paischeff (26 November 1896 – 17 November 1967), better known as Gerda Wrede, was a Finnish actor and speech therapist.

Born in Piikkiö, Gerda Wrede attended the Swedish Theatre's acting school in Helsinki between 1914 and 1916. After finishing her training, she worked at the theatre as an actor until 1921, and then again from 1927 to 1928. In 1931, she became the acting director of the school, and was promoted to the position of principal in 1941.

She was the aunt of the film and theatre director Caspar Wrede.

References

1896 births
1967 deaths
People from Kaarina
People from Turku and Pori Province (Grand Duchy of Finland)
Swedish-speaking Finns
Finnish people of German descent
20th-century Finnish nobility
Finnish actresses
Speech and language pathologists
19th-century Finnish nobility